Shwikar Ibrahim (4 November 1938 – 14 August 2020) was an Egyptian actress. She started her career in Alexandria in some tragedic roles before she was discovered by the Egyptian film director Fateen Abdul Wahab to work as a comedian in TV, cinema and theatres.

Biography 
Shwikar was born in the Egyptian Mediterranean port city of Alexandria to Turkish Egyptian parents.

She died on 14 August 2020, suffering from illness.

Selected filmography

 Ana W Howwa W Heyya (I , He And She) 
 Enta Elli Atalt Papaya (You're Who killed  My Daddy)
 Gharam 'Ala El Tari' El Zera'i ( Love In Agricultural Road)
 Ard El Nefaq (Land Of Hypocrisy)
 Agaza B El Afya (Vacation By Force)
 Donya El Banat (Girls'World) 
 El Hasna' W El Talabah (Belle And Students)  
 Agazet Gharam (Love Vacation) 
 Kashf El Mastur ( Revealed Hidden)
 Zaman El Mamnu' ( Forbidden Time)
 El Nassab W El Kalb (The Swindler And  The Dog)
 El Kammashah ( The Pincers)
 El Ersh (The Shark)
 Ragol Le Haza Al Zaman (A Man For This Time)
 Ebnati W Al Ze'ab (My Daughter And The Wolves)
 Sanawat Al Khatar (Years Of Danger)
 El 'Arbagi (The Coachman)
 Shabab Yarkos Fawk Al Nar (Youth Dancing Over Fire)
 El Mar'ah Heya El Mar'ah (The Woman Is The Woman )
 Fatah Tabhath 'An El Hob ( A Girl Looking For Love)
 Ta'er El Layl El Hazin (The Sad Bird Of Night)
 El Sa"a Mat (The Waiter Died)
 Al-Karnak (Karnak)
 Viva Zalata  (Long Live Zalata)
 El Kaddab (The Liar)
 Madraset El Morahekin (Teenagers school)
 Shellet El Mohtalin ( Cell Of Swindlers)
 El Shahhat (The Beggar)
 Akhtar Ragol Fi El 'Alam (The World's Most Dangerous Man)
 'Aris Bent El Wazir ( Groom Of Daughter Of  Minister)
 Saffah El Nesa' ( Women's Thug)
 Rob' Dastet Ashrar (Evil Dozen's Quarter)
 El 'Ataba Gazaz (Glass Threshold)
 Emra'ati Magnunah Magnunah (My Woman Is Mad Mad )
 'Alam Modhek Geddan ( Very Funny World)
 Shanabo Fi El Masyadah (Shanabo In The Trap)
 El Ragel Da Ha Ygannenni (This Guy Will Make Me Crazy) 
 Gharam Fi Aghostos (Love In August)
 El Shaqiqan (The 2 Brothers)
 Al Regal La Yatazwwagun El Gamilat (Men Don't Marry Beauties)
 El Mared (The Giant)
 Aros El Nil (The Nile's Bride)
 Tariq El Shitan (Devil's Road)
 El Zogah 13 (The Wife 13)
 Gharam El Asyad (Love Of Masters)
 El Do' El Khafet (The Faint Light)
 El Nashshal ( The Pickpocket)
 El Maganin Fi Na'im (Mad In Bliss)
 Kallemni Shokran (Call Me ,Thanks)
 Sayyidati El Gamilah (My Beautiful Lady = My Fair Lady)

References

External links
 

1935 births
2020 deaths
Egyptian film actresses
Egyptian comedians
Egyptian people of Turkish descent
Egyptian television actresses
Egyptian people of Circassian descent
People from Alexandria
20th-century Egyptian actresses
20th-century comedians
21st-century Egyptian actresses
21st-century comedians